On the morning of 22 May 2014, two sport utility vehicles (SUVs) carrying five assailants were driven into a busy street market in Ürümqi, the capital of China's Xinjiang Uyghur Autonomous Region. Up to a dozen explosives were thrown at shoppers from the windows of the SUVs. The SUVs crashed into shoppers, then collided with each other and exploded. 43 people were killed, including 4 of the assailants, and more than 90 wounded, making this the deadliest attack of the Xinjiang conflict. The event was designated as a terrorist attack.

Background

On 30 April 2014, two suicide bombings killed three and injured seventy-nine, leaving a level of high security in the region and the train station where the attack occurred "like a fortress", with men bearing arms at ticket gates, multiple police trucks in the city, and checkpoints. The region had experienced a more volatile year leading up to the May bombings, and Uyghurs worry at the influx of Han Chinese into the region and controls upon their religion and culture, which they fear are being destroyed.

Attack

The attack struck a morning market on North Gongyuan (Park) Street beside People's Park in Saybagh District of central Ürümqi. It is a busy market serving neighbourhood residents, frequented especially by the elderly. According to residents, most customers of the market are Han Chinese, though many vendors are Uyghur.

At 7:50 am CST (although China only has one official time zone, Ürümqi has an unofficial time zone two hours behind Chinese Standard Time, making the time 5:50 am local time), at a time when few people were about due to the early hour, two SUVs without license plates, but flying flags with Uyghur writing, travelling southward, were driven through metal barriers into an area with shoppers. The drivers of the SUVs ran people down while up to a dozen explosives were thrown out the car windows. The vehicles then had a head-on collision, resulting in a large explosion "with flames shooting as high as a one-story building". A cordon was set up to keep onlookers back, but pictures depicting a large black smoke cloud were posted on Weibo, and images showed bodies lying on the floor and destroyed market stalls. Within ten minutes, the injured began to be transported to hospitals. Police and more emergency-service vehicles arrived in the following 30 minutes. Within a few hours, Paramilitary police were patrolling the area, and photographers and videographers were forced to delete images and not to take new ones.

A day after the attack, Chinese state media reported that it was perpetrated by five suicide bombers. 43 people were killed, including four of the assailants, and more than 90 were wounded. The fifth suspect was arrested. Most of the victims were Han Chinese, including many elderly shoppers.

Response
Chinese Communist Party General Secretary Xi Jinping and Premier Li Keqiang responded to the incident by promising "decisive actions against terrorist attacks", and stated that a “strike-first” strategy would be implemented. They also called on government officials in the region to do everything they could to ensure that the injured were assisted, the crime investigated and the perpetrators punished severely.

References

External links
The location of the bombing – QQ map Street View

Attacks in China in 2014
Terrorist incidents in China in 2014
Urumqi 2014 05
Mass murder in 2014
Improvised explosive device bombings in China
Suicide bombings in China
Vehicular rampage in China
History of Ürümqi
Terrorist incidents in China
Terrorist incidents involving vehicular attacks
May 2014 events in China
2014 murders in China
Marketplace attacks in Asia